The Grand Budapest Hotel is a 2014 comedy-drama film written and directed by Wes Anderson, featuring an ensemble cast. The film stars Ralph Fiennes as a concierge who teams up with one of his employees (Tony Revolori) to prove his innocence after he is framed for murder. Anderson's American Empirical Pictures produced the film in association with Studio Babelsberg, Fox Searchlight Pictures, and Indian Paintbrush's Scott Rudin and Steven Rales. Fox Searchlight supervised the commercial distribution, and The Grand Budapest Hotel funding was sourced through Indian Paintbrush and German government-funded tax rebates. 

The Grand Budapest Hotel premiered in competition at the 64th Berlin International Film Festival on February 6, 2014. Its French theatrical release on February 26 preceded the film's global rollout, followed by releases in Germany, North America, and the United Kingdom on March 6–7. Made on a production budget of $25 million, the film earned $172.9 million worldwide. On the review aggregator website Rotten Tomatoes, The Grand Budapest Hotel holds an approval rating of  based on  reviews.

The film garnered nine Academy Award nominations, including Best Picture and Best Director (which were won by Birdman, tying The Grand Budapest Hotel for both the most nominations and wins of the ceremony). The Grand Budapest Hotel won the Oscars for Best Costume Design, Best Makeup and Hairstyling, Best Production Design and Best Original Score. The film led in BAFTA nominations, with 11, including Best Actor for Fiennes, Best Director, and Best Film. It won in the same categories as it did at the Oscars, as well as for Best Original Screenplay. The film won Best Motion Picture – Musical or Comedy at the Golden Globe Awards, with three other nominations, and it received a Screen Actors Guild Award nomination for Outstanding Performance by a Cast in a Motion Picture. Alexandre Desplat won Best Score Soundtrack for Visual Media at the 57th Annual Grammy Awards.

Accolades

References

External links
 

Grand Budapest Hotel